Koch Diamond is a baseball venue in St. Paul, Minnesota, United States  It is home to the St. Thomas Tommies baseball team of the NCAA Division I Summit League. The field opened in 2006 and is named for the former St. Thomas pitcher David Koch.

Features
The park is located along Cretin Avenue in the Union Park neighborhood of St. Paul. The field is used as both a football and soccer practice facility along the outfield, which causes the centerfield fence to be the deepest in all of college baseball, at 465 feet.

Naming
David Koch, for whom the venue is named, pitched for the St. Thomas baseball program in 1952.

See also
 List of NCAA Division I baseball venues

References

College baseball venues in the United States
Baseball venues in Minnesota
Sports venues completed in 2006
St. Thomas (Minnesota) Tommies baseball
2006 establishments in Minnesota
University of St. Thomas (Minnesota)